Huset på Christianshavn (The House at Christianshavn) was an 84-part television comedy series broadcast in Denmark between 1970 and 1977. It was produced by the Nordisk Film company for the national broadcasting corporation, DR. 48 of the episodes were also shown in the German Democratic Republic on DFF.

The series portrayed the lives of the residents of a block of flats in Christianshavn, an old part of Copenhagen.

Cast
 Poul Reichhardt (Olsen)
 Helle Virkner (Mrs. Ellen Olsen)
 Jes Holtsø (William Olsen)
 Paul Hagen (Clausen)
 Lis Løwert (Mrs. Mille Clausen)
 Finn Storgaard (Tue)
 Kirsten Hansen-Møller (Rikke)
 Willy Rathnov (Egon Hansen)
 Kirsten Walther (Karla Hansen)
 Flemming Nielsen ("Bimmer", Karla's baby boy)
 Ove Sprogøe (Larsen)
 Arthur Jensen (Arnold Hannibal Meyer)
 Bodil Udsen (Emma)
 Karen Berg (Mrs. Dagmar Hammerstedt)

References

External links
 DR Bonanza – Online streaming
 
 German site about Huset på Christianshavn

Danish comedy television series
1970s Danish television series
1970 Danish television series debuts
1977 Danish television series endings
Television shows set in Denmark
1970s Danish comedy television series
Copenhagen in fiction
Danish-language television shows
Works by Erik Balling
DR TV original programming